During the 1992–93 English football season, Ipswich Town competed in the inaugural season of the Premier League, following promotion from the First Division the previous season.

Season summary
In the 1992–93 season, Ipswich had a great start to the campaign and by January 1993, were in fourth place in the league and fans were hoping for at least a UEFA Cup place, maybe even the Premiership title, but a dip in form during the final weeks of the season saw the club finish 16th.

First-team squad
Squad at end of season

Left club during season

Reserve squad

Competitions

FA Premier League

League table

Legend

Ipswich Town's score comes first

Matches

FA Cup

League Cup

Transfers

Transfers in

Loans in

Transfers out

Loans out

Awards

Player awards

References

Ipswich Town F.C. seasons
Ipswich Town